Basketball Austria is the governing body of basketball in Austria. It joined FIBA in 1934.

The Austrian Basketball Federation operates the Austrian men's national team and Austrian women's national team. They organize national competitions in Austria, for both the men's and women's senior teams and also the youth national basketball teams.

The top professional league in Austria is the Austrian Basketball Superliga.

The federation used to be named Austrian Basketball Federation or Österreichischer Basketballverband (ÖBV).

See also 
Austria national basketball team
Austria national under-19 basketball team
Austria national under-17 basketball team
Austria women's national basketball team
Austria women's national under-19 basketball team
Austria women's national under-17 basketball team

References

External links 
Official Site 
Austria at FIBA site

Basketball

Fed
Basketball governing bodies in Europe
Sports organizations established in 1934
Organisations based in Vienna
Sport in Vienna